Muadzam Shah is a state constituency in Pahang, Malaysia that is represented in the Pahang State Legislative Assembly.

Demographics

History

Polling districts 
According to the federal gazette issued on 31 October 2022, the Rompin constituency is divided into 38 polling districts.

Representation history

Eelction results

References 

Pahang state constituencies